The Max Planck Institute for Radio Astronomy (MPIfRA) (German: Max-Planck-Institut für Radioastronomie) is located in Bonn, Germany. It is one of 80 institutes in the Max Planck Society (German: Max-Planck-Gesellschaft).

History 
By combining the already existing radio astronomy faculty of the University of Bonn led by Otto Hachenberg with the new Max Planck institute the Max Planck Institute for Radio Astronomy was formed. In 1972 the 100-m radio telescope in Effelsberg was opened. The institute building was enlarged in 1983 and 2002.

The southern wing of the whole complex is occupied by the Argelander Institute of Astronomy of the University of Bonn.

Structure 
The Institute has three main research groups, each with its own Director

Departments 

 Fundamental Physics (Michael Kramer)
 VLBI and Radio Astronomy (Anton Zensus)
 Millimetre Astronomy (Karl Menten)

Independent Research Groups 

 Lise Meitner Group on Fast Radio Bursts as Astrophysical Tools (Laura Spitler)

Graduate Program 
The International Max Planck Research School (IMPRS) for Astronomy and Astrophysics is a highly competitive-entry graduate program offering a Ph.D. The school is run in cooperation with the University of Bonn and University of Cologne.

External links 
 Homepage of the Max Planck Institute for Radio Astronomy
 Homepage of the International Max Planck Research School (IMPRS) for Astronomy and Astrophysics

References 

Radio Astronomy
Astronomy institutes and departments
Max Planck Institute for Radio Astronomy
Organisations based in Bonn